Panjabiwala  is a studio album by singers by Habib Wahid and Shireen Jawad, released in 2007.

Track listing

References

2007 albums
Bengali-language albums
Habib Wahid albums
Shireen Jawad albums